Hyalo Ridge is a tuya in Wells Gray Provincial Park.

References

See also
 List of volcanoes in Canada
 Volcanism of Canada
 Volcanism of Western Canada

Volcanoes of British Columbia
Ridges of British Columbia
Tuyas of Canada
Wells Gray-Clearwater
Monogenetic volcanoes
Pleistocene volcanoes